The Balfour Mission, also referred to as the Balfour Visit, was a formal diplomatic visit to the United States by the British Government during World War I, shortly after the United States declaration of war on Germany (1917).

The mission's purpose was to promote wartime cooperation, and to assess the war-readiness of Britain's new partner. British Foreign Secretary Arthur Balfour, President Woodrow Wilson and Wilson's chief advisor, Colonel House, had a meeting that discussed the secret treaties which bound Britain and France to Italy and others.  Members of the delegation met with many senior leaders in the national government, finance, industry and politics, to explain the British positions. Other meetings dealt with the supply of munitions and other exports, and the proposed Balfour Declaration.

France sent a separate mission at the same time, and these were followed later in 1917 by missions from Italy, Russia, Belgium and Japan, all of whom were invited to address the US Congress.

History
The mission left England on 11 April and arrived in Washington, on 22 April, having landed in Halifax, Nova Scotia on 20 April.

Balfour addressed both houses of Congress – the House of Representatives on 5 May and the Senate on 8 May – becoming the first British person to do so.

Balfour, Colonel Edward M. House and Wilson dined at the White House on 30 April, after which Balfour recounted the details of the secret treaties regarding Italy and the Near East to Wilson. On 18 May, Balfour sent Wilson copies of the Sykes-Picot Agreement, the Allied Notes of March–April 1915, the Treaty of London (1915) and the Treaty of Bucharest (1913).

Cecil Spring Rice, the British ambassador to the United States, stated that the mission had created "an entirely new atmosphere in Anglo- American relations".

Travelling group
The travelling party included:

 Arthur Balfour, British foreign secretary and former prime minister
 Walter Cunliffe, 1st Baron Cunliffe, governor of the Bank of England
 Sir Eric Drummond, who in 1920 became the first secretary-general of the League of Nations (1920–1933)
 Ian Malcolm
 Cecil Dormer
 Geoffrey G. Butler
 Tom Bridges, major general
 Herbert Henry Spender-Clay
 Dudley de Chair, admiral who was Naval Adviser to Foreign Office on Blockade Affairs 
 Vincent Lawford

Others in the party included:
 War Office — Colonel Goodwin, Colonel Langhorne, Major L. W. B. Rees, and Major C. E. Dansey
 Blockade Department Experts — Lord Eustace Percy; Andrew Archibald Paton; F. P. Robinson, of the Board of Trade; S. McKenna, of the War Trade Intelligence Department, and M. D. Peterson of the Foreign Trade Department, Foreign Office. 
 Wheat Commission — Alan Anderson, Chairman, and H. D. Vigor. 
 Munitions — Walter Layton (Later Baron Layton), Director of Requirements and Statistics Branch, Secretariat of the Ministry of Munitions; C. T. Phillips, American and Transport Department, Ministry of Munitions; Captain Leeming, Mr. Amos. 
 Ordnance and Lines of Communication — Captain Heron. 
 Supplies and Transports — Major F. K. Puckle.

See also
 Diplomatic history of World War I

References

Bibliography
 
 
 
 
 
 

World War I conferences
Diplomatic conferences in the United States
1917 in international relations
1917 in Washington, D.C.
United Kingdom in World War I
United States home front during World War I
United Kingdom–United States relations
Diplomatic visits to the United States